James Agar  was an Irish politician.

He was the son of Charles Agar, an Englishman who acquired lands in County Kilkenny, including Gowran Castle. His mother was Ellis Blanchville, daughter of Peter Blanchville of Kilkenny.

He was MP for Old Leighlin in County Carlow from  1703 to 1713; Gowran in County Kilkenny from 1713 to 1714; Callan in County Kilkenny from 1715 to 1727; and St Canice in County Kilkenny from 1727 to 1733.

He married firstly Susannah Alexander, and secondly Mary Wemyss, daughter of Sir Henry Wemyss of Danesfort. By his second wife he had at least four children, including Henry  Agar, James Agar, and Ellis (Elizabeth) Bermingham, Countess of Brandon in her own right. Both Henry and James, after Henry's death, sat in the Irish  House of Commons for Gowran. James fought a long and bitter battle to retain control of the borough of Callan, which eventually led to his death in a duel.

References

Irish MPs 1703–1713
Irish MPs 1713–1714
Irish MPs 1715–1727
Irish MPs 1727–1760
Members of the Parliament of Ireland (pre-1801) for County Kilkenny constituencies
Members of the Parliament of Ireland (pre-1801) for County Roscommon constituencies
Members of the Parliament of Ireland (pre-1801) for County Carlow constituencies